Lasse Selvåg Nordås (born 10 February 2002) is a Norwegian professional footballer who plays as a forward for Tromsø, on loan from FK Bodø/Glimt.

Career
Nordås spent his youth and junior career in Lillestrøm SK, but did not reach the first team. He did however get the chance at Lillestrøm's fellow second-tier contenders Strømmen IF, and scored nine goals in 26 games. Ahead of the 2021 season he signed for FK Bodø/Glimt, where he scored his first goal in his third outing, all as a substitute. He scored his first hat-trick in the 2021 Norwegian Football Cup first round against Rana FK.

Career statistics

Club

Honours
Bodø/Glimt
Eliteserien: 2021

References

2002 births
Living people
People from Skedsmo
Norwegian footballers
Association football forwards
Norway youth international footballers
Strømmen IF players
FK Bodø/Glimt players
Norwegian First Division players
Eliteserien players
Sportspeople from Viken (county)